Elmer J. Fudd is an animated cartoon character in the Warner Bros. Looney Tunes/Merrie Melodies series and the archenemy of Bugs Bunny. He has one of the more disputed origins in the Warner Bros. cartoon pantheon (second only to Bugs himself). But it was evidenced that the true origins of Elmer was that he was actually created by Fred "Tex" Avery in 1937, as a "Running Gag" character with small, sometimes squinty eyes, with a derby hat and with a green suit.' His aim is to hunt Bugs, but he usually ends up seriously injuring himself and other antagonizing characters. He speaks in an unusual way, replacing his Rs and Ls with Ws, so he often refers to Bugs Bunny as a "scwewy" or "wascawwy (rascally) wabbit". Elmer's signature catchphrase is, "Shhh. Be vewy vewy quiet, I'm hunting wabbits", as well as his trademark laughter.

The best known Elmer Fudd cartoons include Chuck Jones' work What's Opera, Doc? (one of the few times Fudd bested Bugs, though he felt bad about it), the Rossini parody Rabbit of Seville, and the "Hunting Trilogy" of "Rabbit Season/Duck Season" shorts (Rabbit Fire, Rabbit Seasoning, and Duck! Rabbit, Duck!) with Fudd, Bugs Bunny, and Daffy Duck. An earlier prototype of character named Elmer set some of the recognizable Elmer's aspects before the character's more conspicuous features were set.

Egghead
Tex Avery introduced a new character in his cartoon short Egghead Rides Again, released July 17, 1937. Egghead initially was depicted as having a bulbous nose, a voice like Joe Penner (provided  by radio mimic Danny Webb)  and an egg-shaped head. Many cartoon historians believe that Egghead evolved into Elmer over a period of a couple of years.  However, animation historian Michael Barrier asserts, that "Elmer Fudd was not a modified version of his fellow Warner Bros. character Egghead" and that "the two characters were always distinct. That was evidenced by Elmer's early prototype being identified in a Warner publicity sheet for Cinderella Meets Fella (filed with the Library of Congress as a copyright description) as 'Egghead's brother.'" and that "The Egghead-Elmer story is actually a little messy, my sense being that most of the people involved, whether they were making the films or publicizing them, not only had trouble telling the characters apart but had no idea why they should bother trying."

Egghead made his second appearance in 1938's Daffy Duck & Egghead and was teamed with Warner Bros.' newest cartoon star Daffy Duck. Egghead continued to make appearances in the Warner cartoons in 1938, such as in A-Lad-In Bagdad (1938), and in Count Me Out (1938).  Egghead shifts from being bald, to having a Moe Howard haircut. and always has a huge egg-shaped head. Egghead returned decades later in the compilation film Daffy Duck's Quackbusters, while going back to being bald again and redesigned into looking like Elmer Fudd and wearing Elmer Fudd's Clothes and Derby Hat. More recently, he also made a cameo appearance at the end of Looney Tunes: Back in Action and was also given in his own story, which starred him alongside Pete Puma, in the Looney Tunes comic book.

One animation history suggests that the Egghead character was based on Ripley's Believe It or Not! cartoonist and entertainer Robert Ripley.

Egghead has the distinction of being the first recurring character created for Leon Schlesinger's Merrie Melodies series (to be followed by such characters as Sniffles, Inki, Elmer Fudd, and even Bugs Bunny), which had previously contained only one-shot characters, although during the Harman-Ising era, Foxy, Goopy Geer, and Piggy each appeared in a few Merrie Melodies.

One of Egghead's final appearances is Count Me Out.

Voice actors for Egghead

 Mel Blanc (as Egghead; Egghead Rides Again, and Egghead when he "woo-hoos" in Daffy Duck & Egghead).
 Danny Webb (as Egghead; Egghead Rides Again, Daffy Duck & Egghead, A-Lad-In Bagdad, and Count Me Out).
 Mark Kausler voices Egghead in Daffy Duck's Quackbusters.

Elmer Fudd in his true early years 
 
In 1937, Tex Avery created a very early version of Elmer Fudd and introduced him in Little Red Walking Hood, as mysterious hero whistling everywhere he goes. In this cartoon, he had a derby hat, small squinty eyes, big reddish noise, a high collar around his neck, a green long sleeve shirt, green pants, and a bald circle-like human head. At the end of the cartoon, the character tells the villain, the big bad wolf, that he is "the hero in this picture" after he hits the wolf in the head with a mallet. He then continued to make more appearances in the Warner cartoons in 1938, such as in The Isle of Pingo Pongo (made and copyrighted in 1937, released in 1938) (also Prototype-Elmer's second appearance), Cinderella Meets Fella (1938), A Feud There Was (the first time he is fully called "Elmer Fudd") (1938), Johnny Smith and Poker-Huntas (1938) Hamateur Night (made and copyrighted in 1938, released in 1939) A Day at the Zoo (made and copyrighted in 1938, released in 1939) and Believe It or Else (1939), mostly as a "running gag" character. In A Feud There Was (1938), Elmer made his entrance riding a motor scooter with the words "Elmer Fudd, Peacemaker" displayed on the side, the first onscreen use of that name. Elmer then appeared on early merchandise and of early Looney Tunes books in 1938 and 1939, and even on the lobby cards for "The Isle of Pingo Pongo" and for "Cinderella Meets Fella" with his name attached on them.

In the 1939 cartoon Dangerous Dan McFoo, a new voice actor, Arthur Q. Bryan, was hired to provide the voice of the hero dog character. It was in this cartoon that the popular "milk-sop" wabbit voice of Elmer Fudd was created. Elmer Fudd has since been the chief antagonistic force in most of the Bugs Bunny cartoons, initiating one of the most famous rivalries in the history of American cinema. Sometime later on in this year, some new drawings and redesigns of Elmer Fudd were being created by a character designer, Charlie Thorson.

Elmer emerges

In 1940, the Egghead-like Elmer's appearance was refined, giving him a chin and a less bulbous nose (although still wearing his old clothing that he was wearing in Tex Avery's earlier cartoons) and Arthur Q. Bryan's "Dan McFoo" voice in what most people consider Elmer Fudd's first true appearance: a Chuck Jones short entitled Elmer's Candid Camera, in which a rabbit drives Elmer insane; the rabbit was an early appearance of what would become Bugs Bunny, beginning their long-standing rivalry. Later that year, he appeared in Friz Freleng's Confederate Honey (where he was called Ned Cutler) and The Hardship of Miles Standish where his voice and Little Red Walking Hood-like appearance were still the same. Jones would use  Elmer one more time, in 1941's Elmer's Pet Rabbit; its other title character is labeled as Bugs Bunny, but is also identical to his counterpart in Camera. In the interim, the two starred in A Wild Hare. Bugs appears with a carrot, New York accent, and "What's Up, Doc?" catchphrase all in place for the first time, although the voice and physique are as yet somewhat off. Elmer has a better voice, a trimmer figure (designed by Robert Givens, which would be reused soon later in Jones' Good Night Elmer, this time without a red nose) and his familiar hunting clothes. He is much more recognizable as the Elmer Fudd of later cartoons than Bugs is here. In his earliest appearances, Elmer actually "wikes wabbits", either attempting to take photos of Bugs, or adopting Bugs as his pet. The rascally rabbit has the poor Fudd so perplexed that there is little wonder as to why Elmer would become a hunter and in some cases actually proclaim, "I hate wittle gway wabbits!" after pumping buckshot down a rabbit hole.

Elmer's role in these two films, that of would-be hunter, dupe and foil for Bugs, would remain his main role forever after, and although Bugs Bunny was called upon to outwit many more worthy opponents, Elmer somehow remained Bugs' classic nemesis, despite (or because of) his legendary gullibility, small size, short temper, and shorter attention span. In Rabbit Fire, he declares himself vegetarian, hunting for sport only.

Elmer was usually cast as a hapless big-game hunter, armed with a double-barreled shotgun (albeit one which could be fired much more than twice without being reloaded) and creeping through the woods "hunting wabbits". In a few cartoons, though, he assumed a completely different persona—a wealthy industrialist type, occupying a luxurious penthouse, or, in one episode involving a role reversal, a sanitarium—which Bugs would of course somehow find his way into. In Dog Gone People, he had an ordinary office job working for demanding boss "Mister Cwabtwee". In another cartoon (Mutt in a Rut) he appeared to work in an office and had a dog he called "Wover Boy", whom he took hunting, though Bugs did not appear. (Elmer also has a hunting dog in To Duck or Not to Duck; in that film, the dog is named Laramore.)

Several episodes featured Elmer differently. One (What's Up, Doc?, 1950) has Bugs Bunny relating his life story to a biographer, and recalling a time which was a downturn for the movie business. Elmer Fudd is a well-known entertainer who, looking for a new partner for his act, sees Bugs Bunny (after passing caricatures of many other famous 1940s actors (Al Jolson, Jack Benny, Eddie Cantor, Bing Crosby) who, like Bugs, are also out of work). Elmer and Bugs do a one-joke act cross-country, with Bugs dressed like a pinhead, and when he does not know the answer to a joke, Elmer gives it and hits him with a pie in the face. Bugs begins to tire of this gag and pulls a surprise on Fudd, answering the joke correctly and bopping Elmer with a mallet, which prompts the man to point his rifle at Bugs. The bunny asks nervously: "Eh, what's up doc?", which results in a huge round of applause from the audience. Bugs tells Elmer they may be on to something, and Elmer, with the vaudevillian's instinct of sticking with a gag that catches on, nods that they should re-use it. According to  account, the common Elmer-as-hunter episodes are entirely staged.

One episode where Bugs "lost" in the hunting was Hare Brush (1956). Here, Elmer has been committed to an insane asylum because he believes he is a rabbit (though it is also revealed that he is a millionaire and owns a mansion and a yacht). Bugs Bunny enters Fudd's room and Elmer bribes him with carrots, then leaves the way the real rabbit entered. Bugs acts surprisingly (for him) naïve, assuming Elmer just wanted to go outside for a while. Elmer's psychiatrist arrives, and thinking Fudd's delusion has affected his appearance, drugs Bugs and conditions him into believing that  is Elmer Fudd, after which Bugs starts wearing hunting clothes and acting like Elmer, hunting the rabbit-costumed Fudd, who is in turn acting like Bugs. Their hunt is cut short when Bugs is arrested by a government agent as Elmer Fudd is wanted for tax evasion. After Bugs is hauled away trying to explain that the rabbit is Elmer Fudd, Fudd breaks the fourth wall and tells the audience "I may be a scwewy wabbit, but I'm not going to Alcatwaz" as he hops away as if he had planned the whole thing.

Elmer Fudd has occasionally appeared in other costumes, notably as Cupid, opposite Daffy Duck in The Stupid Cupid (1944).

The Bugs–Elmer partnership was so familiar to audiences that in a late 1950s cartoon, Bugs' Bonnets, a character study is made of what happens to the relationship between the two when they each accidentally don a different selection of hats (Native American wig, pilgrim hat, military helmets, bridal veil and top hat, to name a few). The result is comic mayhem; a steady game of one-upmanship that ultimately leads to matrimony.

Fat Elmer

For a short time in the 1941–1942 season, Elmer's appearance was modified again, for five cartoons: Wabbit Twouble, The Wacky Wabbit, The Wabbit Who Came to Supper, Any Bonds Today? and Fresh Hare. He became a heavy-set, beer-bellied character, patterned after Arthur Q. Bryan's real-life appearance, and still chasing Bugs (or vice versa). However, audiences did not accept a fat Fudd, so the slimmer version returned for good.

This period also saw a temporary change in Elmer's relationship with Bugs Bunny. Instead of being the hunter, Elmer was the victim of unprovoked pestering by Bugs. In Wabbit Twouble, Bugs plays several gags on Elmer, advising the audience, "I do dis kind o' stuff to him all t'wough da picture!" (A line which would later be said, somewhat ironically, by Cecil Turtle as he and his friends cheat Bugs out of winning a race). Another short, The Wacky Wabbit, finds Elmer focused on prospecting for gold which would be used to fund the World War II effort. Elmer sings a variation of the old prospector's tune "Oh! Susanna" made just for this cartoon (complete with the phrase "V for Victory"), with Bugs joining in just before starting to hassle Elmer. He made a later appearance in The Sylvester & Tweety Mysteries episode "Moskow Side Story" as a Russian version with a simple name "Boris" who owns another comedy club in Russia.

Elmer-speak
He nearly always vocalised consonants [r] and [l], pronouncing them as [w] instead (a trait that also characterized Tweety Bird) when he would talk in his slightly raspy voice. This trait was prevalent in the Elmer's Candid Camera and Elmer's Pet Rabbit cartoons, where the writers would give him exaggerated lines such as, "My, that weawwy was a dewicious weg of wamb." to further exaggerate his qualities as a harmless nebbish. The writers often gave him lines filled with those letters, such as doing Shakespeare's Romeo as "What wight thwough yonduh window bweaks!" or Wagner's Ride of the Valkyries as "Kiww the wabbit, kiww the wabbit, kiww the wabbit...!" or "The Beautifuw Bwue Danube, by Johann Stwauss", Stage Door Cartoons line "Oh, you dubbuh-cwossing wabbit! You tweachewous miscweant!" or the name of actress "Owivia deHaviwwand".

Part of the joke is that Elmer is presumably incapable of pronouncing his own first name correctly. Occasionally, Elmer would properly pronounce an "r" or "l" sound, depending on whether or not it was vital for the audience to understand what the word was. (For example, in 1944's The Old Grey Hare, he clearly pronounces the "r" in the word "picture".) Usually, Elmer mispronounces the "r" and "l" by substituting the sound of "w".

Later appearances
Arthur Q. Bryan died in 1959, but the character was not completely retired at that time. Elmer made appearances in several television specials in the 1970s and 1980s, and some cameo roles in two of the Looney Tunes feature-film compilations.

Elmer made a brief headshot cameo appearance in the final scene of Who Framed Roger Rabbit (1988) with other famous characters.

Elmer would also appear frequently on the animated series Tiny Toon Adventures as a teacher at Acme Looniversity, where he was the idol and favorite teacher of Elmyra Duff, the slightly deranged animal lover who resembles Elmer in basic head design, name and lack of intellect. On the other hand, a younger version of him makes a single appearance in the episode Plucky's Dastardly Deed, and is named "Egghead Jr", the "smartest kid in class".

Elmer also made cameos on Animaniacs, one in Turkey Jerky, another in the Pinky and the Brain short, Don't Tread on Us.

Elmer also had a guest starring appearance on Histeria! in the episode "The Teddy Roosevelt Show", in a sketch where he portrayed Gutzon Borglum. This sketch depicts Elmer/Gutzon's construction of Mount Rushmore, accompanied by Borglum's son Lincoln, portrayed by Loud Kiddington. Elmer made another appearance on Histeria!, this time in his traditional role, during a sketch where the bald eagle trades places with the turkey during Thanksgiving weekend, featured in the episode "Americana".

Fudd also appeared on The Sylvester & Tweety Mysteries in the first-season episode A Ticket to Crime as detective Sam Fudd; at the end he took off his clothes and turned into Elmer.

Elmer appears as part of the TuneSquad team in Space Jam. In one part of the game he and Yosemite Sam shoot out the teeth of one of the Monstars dressed in black suits while Misirlou is heard in the background, a reference TNG be early films of Quentin Tarantino.

Elmer took on a more villainous role in Looney Tunes: Back in Action. He first appears as Bugs Bunny and Daffy Duck's co-star in a new movie, where he shoots Daffy repeatedly, and is later seen shooting Bugs per the film's script after Daffy's firing. He later appears in the Louvre museum, where he reveals himself to be a secret agent for the Acme Corporation. Elmer chases Bugs and Daffy through the paintings in the Louvre museum, taking on the different art styles as they do so. At the end, Elmer forgets to change back to his normal style after jumping out of the pointillist painting Sunday Afternoon on the Island of La Grande Jatte by Georges Seurat, allowing Bugs to easily disintegrate Elmer by blowing a fan at him.

A four-year-old version of Elmer was featured in the Baby Looney Tunes episode "A Bully for Bugs", where he kept taking all of Bugs' candy, and also bullied the rest of his friends. He was also shown with short blond hair. He appeared in most of the songs.

An even more villainous Elmer appeared in two episodes of Duck Dodgers as The Mother Fudd, an alien who would spread a disease that caused all affected by it to stand around laughing like Elmer (a parody of the Flood in Halo and the Borg in Star Trek).

In Loonatics Unleashed, his descendant, Electro J. Fudd''', tried to prove himself the universe's greatest hunter by capturing Ace Bunny, but settled for Danger Duck instead. Elmer himself also makes an appearance in the form of a photo which shows he presumably died at the hands of a giant squirrel.

In December 2009, Elmer made an appearance in a GEICO commercial where the director tells him to say rabbits instead of "wabbits". He was again voiced by Billy West.

Elmer Fudd appears in The Looney Tunes Show, voiced by Billy West. Portrayed as a wealthy businessman coming home after a hard day's work in the "Merrie Melodies" part of the episode "Best Friends," he sings about his love of "gwiwwed cheese" sandwiches. He later had a brief cameo appearance in "Fish and Visitors" as a weather forecaster briefly exclaiming about the rainy weather and doing his famous chuckle at the end. In "Working Duck," Elmer Fudd appeared as a newsman where he reports that Daffy Duck was fired from his position as a security guard after falling asleep during a nighttime bank robbery in which $10 million was stolen. Later on, Elmer Fudd reports that EnormoCorp went out of business due to the worst business decision in the history of business decisions caused by its CEO Daffy Duck (who succeeded the previous CEO Foghorn Leghorn who retired) where he went with the "Proceed as Planned" choice instead of the "Delay the Merger" choice when he mistook Pete Puma as the new muffin man. As a result of this, Elmer mentioned that 10,000 of its workers are now out of a job and states that experts fear that the world economy could collapse. Elmer also states that disgraced CEO Daffy Duck could not be reached for a comment. In "A Christmas Carol," Elmer Fudd reports on Foghorn Leghorn's plans to end the heat wave on Christmas. Elmer Fudd later joins the other characters in the Christmas song called "Christmas Rules" at the end of the episode. In "Dear John," Elmer Fudd reports on Daffy Duck winning a spot on the city council. Elmer Fudd later reports on Daffy Duck's apparent death where he supposedly lost control of his parade float and drove into the St. Bastian River. In "The Black Widow," Elmer Fudd reports on the theft of the Hillhurst Diamond from the museum caused by someone called "The Black Widow."

On June 8, 2011, Elmer starred in the 3-D short "Daffy's Rhapsody" with Daffy Duck. That short was going to precede the film Happy Feet Two, but was instead shown with Journey 2: The Mysterious Island.

Elmer Fudd appears in Looney Tunes: Rabbits Run, voiced again by Billy West. He appears as a spy working for the Mexican general Foghorn Leghorn.

In the 2017 DC Comics/Looney Tunes crossover books, an alternate version of Elmer Fudd was created for a story in which the character was designed more for the DC Universe and was pitted against Batman in the Batman/Elmer Fudd Special. In the story, Elmer is a bounty hunter that originated from the country side before he moved to Gotham to make ends meet. He considered putting the shotgun away for good when he fell in love with Silver St. Cloud, but she was killed by hitman Bugs "The Bunny". He goes to a bar called Porky's (which has attendants that are humanoid versions of other famous Looney Tunes stars) to kill Bugs. Bugs confesses to killing Silver, but avoids death by telling Elmer that Bruce Wayne hired him to do it. Elmer believes Bugs as Bruce was Silver's former lover, and shoots Bruce at a party for vengeance. Batman confronts Elmer in his apartment and defeats the gunman in a fight, where Elmer tells Batman about Silver's death and Bugs. Elmer and Batman return to Porky's and take out most of the crowd before confronting Bugs. The three are shocked to find Silver in the bar herself, where she revealed that she left Bruce and Elmer because of their dangerous lifestyles and had Bugs fake her death. The story ends with all three of the men requesting a glass of carrot juice from Porky. In the issue's backup story, Bugs, Elmer, and Batman re-enact the famous "Rabbit Season, Duck Season" sketch with Batman replacing Daffy as Bugs tells Elmer it is "Bat Season". After getting shot by Elmer too many times, Batman takes Bugs' advice and makes it Robin season, causing Elmer to pursue the Dark Knight's sidekicks instead.

Elmer Fudd appears in New Looney Tunes, voiced by Jeff Bergman.

Elmer Fudd was depicted without his trademark double-barreled shotgun in the first season of Looney Tunes Cartoons on the streaming service, HBO Max. The series executive producer and showrunner, Peter Browngardt, said the character could continue to use cartoon violence, such as dynamite and Acme related paraphernalia. The absence of the shotgun has garnered both acclaim and controversy. By 2021, his shotgun was reinstated in the show's second season. He is once again voiced by Jeff Bergman in the series.

Portrayal
Fudd was originally voiced by radio actor Arthur Q. Bryan, but on seven occasions during Bryan's lifetime, the voice was provided by Mel Blanc: in Good Night Elmer (1940), Blanc did Elmer's crying; in The Wacky Wabbit (1942), Blanc did Fudd's screams of fear; in The Big Snooze (1946), Blanc spoke as Fudd crying, "Oh, agony, agony!"; in The Scarlet Pumpernickel (1950), only a single line was needed, and bringing in Bryan was not cost effective; in Quack Shot (1954), Blanc did Elmer's Peter Lorre-esque laugh after he is shot in the face by his toy battleship; in Wideo Wabbit, Blanc did Elmer's cry of pain; and in What's Opera, Doc?, Elmer's furious scream "SMOG!" was dubbed by Blanc, although Bryan had voiced the rest of the part. In The Stupid Cupid (1944), since Elmer has no dialogue in the cartoon, Frank Graham provided his laugh. Later, during the musician's union strike of 1958, Dave Barry did the voice for Elmer's co-starring appearance in Pre-Hysterical Hare, as Bryan was ill during production of the cartoon. Elmer was originally going to be voiced in that cartoon by Daws Butler.

In 1959, Bryan died at age 60, and Hal Smith was selected to replace him as Elmer, but after just two cartoons (Dog Gone People (1960) and What's My Lion? (1961)) were recorded by the new actor, with Blanc doing Fudd's crying and gurgling in two scenes in the former cartoon, and another (Crow's Feat (1962)) was made in which Fudd has no lines and therefore no voice, the character was soon retired. Although in more recent years other voice actors have alternated as Elmer's voice, Bryan's characterization remains the definitive one. He was never credited onscreen, because Blanc had a clause in his contract that required him to receive a screen credit and, perhaps inadvertently, denied the same to other voice performers.

Blanc would take on the role regularly in the 1960s, 1970s and 1980s, supplying Elmer's voice for new footage in The Bugs Bunny Show (while Smith voiced the character in the commercials until 1965 when Blanc took up the role full time), The Porky Pig Show, compilation feature films and similar TV specials, as well as some all-new specials. He admitted in his autobiography that he found the voice difficult to get "right", never quite making it his own, which is why his Elmer voice sounded deep and gravelly in the 60s and 70s; however, it began sounding closer to Bryan's Elmer voice, beginning with Bugs Bunny's Valentine (1979). In Speechless (1989), the famous lithograph issued following Blanc's death, Elmer is not shown among the characters bowing their heads in tribute to Blanc.

Other voice actors
Beside Bryan, numerous other actors have voiced Elmer, including:
 Mel Blanc (as Prototype-Elmer; Little Red Walking Hood, The Isle of Pingo Pongo, A Feud There Was, Johnny Smith and Poker-Huntas, Hamateur Night, A Day at the Zoo; as Elmer; Good Night, Elmer, screaming in The Wacky Wabbit, saying, "Oh, agony, agony!" in The Big Snooze, The Scarlet Pumpernickel, laughing in Quack Shot, screaming in Wideo Wabbit, screaming, "SMOG!" in What's Opera, Doc?, one line in A Mutt in a Rut, crying and gurgling in Dog Gone People, The Bugs Bunny Show, The Porky Pig Show, American Airlines commercials, Daffy Duck and Porky Pig Meet the Groovie Goolies, The New Adventures of Bugs Bunny, 4 More Adventures of Bugs Bunny, Bugs Bunny’s High-Fructose Christmas Record, Bugs Bunny Vitamins commercials, A Connecticut Rabbit in King Arthur's Court, Bugs Bunny's Valentine, Bugs Bunny's Looney Christmas Tales, Bugs Bunny's Bustin' Out All Over, Portrait of the Artist as a Young Bunny, The Bugs Bunny Mystery Special, Six Flags Great America commercial, Sony Electronics commercial, Signet Bank commercial, Looney Tunes Learn About Shapes and Sizes, Looney Tunes Learn About Numbers, Looney Tunes Learn About Sing-Along Songs, Dance Party USA, Oldsmobile commercial, Warner Cinema commercial)
 Danny Webb  (as Prototype-Elmer; Cinderella Meets Fella, and Believe It or Else).
 Roy Rogers (as Prototype-Elmer; singing voice in A Feud There Was)
 Frank Graham (The Stupid Cupid)
 Gilbert Mack (Golden Records records, Bugs Bunny Songfest)
 Dave Barry (Pre-Hysterical Hare)
 Hal Smith (Post Cereal Alpha-Bits commercials, Tang commercials, Dog Gone People, What's My Lion?, Kool-Aid commercials)
 Richard Andrews (Bugs Bunny Exercise and Adventure Album)
 Paul Kuhn (Bugs Bunny's Wild World of Sports)
 Darrell Hammond ("Wappin'")
 Noel Blanc (You Rang? answering machine messages, Family Guy Presents Stewie Griffin: The Untold Story, Family Guy)
 Jeff Bergman (Happy Birthday, Bugs!: 50 Looney Years, Holiday Inn commercial, Tiny Toon Adventures, Tyson Foods commercial, Box-Office Bunny, Bugs Bunny's Overtures to Disaster, (Blooper) Bunny, Invasion of the Bunny Snatchers, Cartoon Network bumpers, Mad, Looney Tunes Dash, Wun Wabbit Wun, New Looney Tunes, Ani-Mayhem, Looney Tunes Cartoons)
 Greg Burson (Tiny Toon Adventures, Yosemite Sam and the Gold River Adventure!, Bugs Bunny: Rabbit Rampage, Have Yourself a Looney Tunes Christmas, Looney Tunes B-Ball, The Sylvester & Tweety Mysteries, Space Jam (additional lines), Bugs Bunny's Learning Adventures, Sheep, Dog 'n' Wolf, various commercials)
 Joe Alaskey (Looney Tunes River Ride, Tiny Toon Adventures: How I Spent My Vacation, You Don't Know Doc! ACME Wise-Guy Edition)
 Keith Scott (Toyota commercials, The Looney Tunes Radio Show, Looney Rock)"Keith Scott-"The One-Man Crowd"". Retrieved September 23, 2020.
 Jim Meskimen (Bugs & Friends Sing the Beatles)
 Frank Welker (Animaniacs)
 Billy West (Space Jam, Bugs & Friends Sing Elvis, Warner Bros. Sing-Along: Quest for Camelot, Warner Bros. Sing-Along: Looney Tunes, Histeria!, The Looney Tunes Kwazy Christmas, Time Warner Cable commercials, The 1st 13th Annual Fancy Anvil Awards Show Program Special...Live!...In Stereo, Looney Tunes: Back in Action, Bah, Humduck! A Looney Tunes Christmas, A Looney Tunes Sing-A-Long Christmas, GEICO commercial, The Looney Tunes Show, Daffy's Rhapsody, Looney Tunes: Rabbits Run, various video games and webtoons)
 Chris Edgerly (Drawn Together)
 Tom Kenny (Looney Tunes webtoons)
 Brian Drummond (Baby Looney Tunes)
 Quinton Flynn (Robot Chicken)
 Kevin Shinick (Mad)
 James Arnold Taylor (one line in Daffy's Rhapsody)
 Gary Martin (Looney Tunes Take-Over Weekend promotion)
 Seth Green (Robot Chicken)
 Seth MacFarlane (Family Guy)
 Eric Bauza (Looney Tunes: World of Mayhem, Bugs Bunny in The Golden Carrot, Space Jam: A New Legacy, Bugs and Daffy's Thanksgiving Road Trip)

In popular culture
In the film Fletch Lives'' (1989), the eponymous character (while in disguise) gives his name as "Elmer Fudd Gantry".

In amateur radio, new amateurs' mentors are called "Elmers", putatively for superficial resemblance to the cartoon character, and perhaps Fudd's use of "broadcastable" euphemisms while (frequently) swearing.

See also
 List of cartoons featuring Elmer Fudd

References

Looney Tunes characters
Fictional professional hunters
Film characters introduced in 1937
Film characters introduced in 1940
Fictional characters who break the fourth wall
Fictional characters with speech impediment
Animated human characters
Male characters in animation
Tex Avery